Chettisham is a pretty hamlet in East Cambridgeshire between Ely  and Littleport.  The main claim to fame is the attractive St. Michael church.

There are some pictures and a description of the church at the Cambridgeshire Churches website.

References

External links

Villages in Cambridgeshire
East Cambridgeshire District